Release the Cure is the fourth and final full-length album released by American hardcore band Indecision. It was produced by Roger Miret of Agnostic Front and released on M.I.A. Records in 1999.

The album saw the band experiment with a more metal sound, re-recording songs from previous albums; and the lyrical content was notably more socio-political, with songs questioning the government and health care, and conspiracy theories regarding  AIDS and cancer research.

Indecision disbanded in May 2000 in El Paso, Texas after a show with Kill Your Idols.

Track listing 
 Higher Side of Low
 May Be Monitored to Assure Quality Control
 Release the Cure
 Through the Wasteland Go Searching We
 Tunnel Vision
 Burning Saints
 Crawling
 Save Me
 Dead
 Suspension of Disbelief
 At the Wake
 This Time Tomorrow
 End of a Short Rope

1999 albums
Indecision (band) albums